The Vine Farm, formerly The Vine, is a Jacobean country house in Northbourne, Kent, England. It is a Grade II* listed building, with a grade II listed cottage and walls.

Building

The house was constructed in the 17th century. It is built to a simple E plan, with two projecting wings. The left hand wing is a 19th century rebuild which was built on the original foundations by Frederick Morrice, who also worked on nearby Betteshanger House.

References

Grade II* listed buildings in Kent
Dover District